Adul Lahsoh (born 19 September 1986), simply known as Dun is a Thai of Malay descent retired professional footballer who plays as a defensive midfielder.

Personal life

Lahsoh hails from Phatthalung province and is a Muslim of Malay descent.

Club career

His career began in the youth team Adul of Chonburi. In 2004, he received a contract for the first Team, for whom he played until 2007. During this time he completed a total of 38 games for the club. In his first three years in Chonburi, he managed the team to promotion to the Thai Premier League and became champions for the first time in 2007. 2006 also was with the club in the final of the Singapore Cup. He was followed, in 2008, his former coach Walter Jäger to Japan. There he played a season for Gainare Tottori in the JFL, before returning to Chonburi. On 6 December 2015 Buriram United announced that Lahsoh would join the club for the 2016 season after having spent 7 years at Chonburi.

Phitsanulok
In June 2022, it was announced that he joined Phitsanulok F.C., as a Head coach and player

International career

Adul available since 2007 in the U-23 squad, and took part in the Southeast playing your 207th. He was able to win the team gold medal. He also has played a game for the senior team. He was part of the 2012 AFF Suzuki Cup, 2013 King's Cup, 2014 FIFA World Cup qualification (AFC), and the 2015 AFC Asian Cup qualification.
In October, 2013 he played a friendly match against Bahrain. In October 15, 2013 he played against Iran in the 2015 AFC Asian Cup qualification. He was named captain by new coach Kiatisuk Senamuang for the 2014 AFF Suzuki Cup. In May 2015, was called up by Thailand to play in the 2018 FIFA World Cup qualification (AFC) against Vietnam.

International goals

Honours

Club
Chonburi
 Thai Premier League (1): 2007
 Thai FA Cup (1): 2010
 Kor Royal Cup (3): 2009, 2011, 2012

Buriram United
 Kor Royal Cup (1): 2016

 Lamphun Warriors
 Thai League 2 (1): 2021–22
 Thai League 3 (1): 2020–21

International
Thailand U-23
 Sea Games  Gold Medal (1); 2007

Thailand
 ASEAN Football Championship (2): 2014, 2016

References

External links

1986 births
Living people
Adul Lahsoh
Adul Lahsoh
Adul Lahsoh
Adul Lahsoh
Association football midfielders
Adul Lahsoh
Adul Lahsoh
Adul Lahsoh
Gainare Tottori players
Thai expatriate footballers
Thai expatriate sportspeople in Japan
Expatriate footballers in Japan
Adul Lahsoh
Adul Lahsoh
Southeast Asian Games medalists in football
Adul Lahsoh
Competitors at the 2007 Southeast Asian Games